The 2012 Western New York Flash season was the club's fourth season of existence. The club played in the newly created WPSL Elite League following the suspension of Women's Professional Soccer.

Background

Review 

On January 30, 2012, the WPS announced that the league would suspend operations for the 2012 season, meaning that the Flash will not have a main domestic league to participate in for the season.

Club

Roster 

As of May 22, 2011

Management

Competitions

Preseason

WPSL Elite

Standings

Results summary

Results by round

Matches

WPSL Elite Playoffs

U.S. Women's Challenge Cup

Statistics

Player movement and trades

Transfers in

Transfers out

Awards and honors

References 

2012
American soccer clubs 2012 season
2012 Women's Professional Soccer season
2012 in sports in New York (state)